Legs Diamond was a gangster in Philadelphia and New York.

Legs Diamond may also refer to:

Legs Diamond (musical), a 1988 musical written by Peter Allen
Legs Diamond (band), an American rock and roll band
Legs Diamond (album)

See also
Legz Diamond, an American guitarist from Detroit, Michigan